Orielton is a rural locality in the local government area of  Sorell in the Central and Hobart regions of Tasmania, Australia. The 2016 census determined a population of 355 for the state suburb of Orielton.

History
Orielton was gazetted as a locality in 1960.

Geography
Most boundaries of the locality are survey lines.

The Orielton Rivulet is an intermittent stream that flows through the locality into the Orielton Lagoon near Sorell.

Road infrastructure
The Tasman Highway (A3) enters from the south and runs through via the town to the north, where it exits. Route C350 (Fingerpost Road) starts at an intersection with A3 and runs north-west until it exits.

References

Localities of Southern Midlands Council
Localities of Sorell Council
Localities of City of Clarence
Towns in Tasmania